Comparative endocrinology  is concerned with the many complexities of vertebrate and invertebrate endocrine systems at the sub-molecular, molecular, cellular and organismal levels of analysis. It is an interdisciplinary knowledge in the fields of biology and medicine concerned with the morphological and functional aspects of organisms' development.  The discovery of new hormones often first occurs in model organisms before orthologs are found in mammals.

See also
 Endocrinology
 Pediatric endocrinology
 Neuroendocrinology
 Reproductive endocrinology
 Hormone
 Endocrine disease
 Interdisciplinary sub-specialties of medicine

References

Endocrinology